Michal Hudec is a Slovak professional ice hockey player who played with HC 05 Banská Bystrica in the Slovak Extraliga.

References

Living people
HC Slovan Bratislava players
1979 births
Slovak ice hockey defencemen
Ice hockey people from Bratislava
Slovak expatriate ice hockey players in the Czech Republic
Slovak expatriate ice hockey players in the United States
HC '05 Banská Bystrica players